Robert "Danny" Gardiner (third ¼ 1939 – 14 January 2015) was an English professional rugby league footballer who played in the 1960s and 1970s.

Background
Danny Gardiner was born in Kirkby-in-Furness, Lancashire, England (birth registered in Ulverston district, Lancashire, England).

Playing career

International honours
Danny Gardiner won a cap for Great Britain while at Wigan in 1965 against New Zealand.

Challenge Cup Final appearances
Danny Gardiner played left-, i.e. number 8, in Wigan's 20-16 victory over Hunslet in the 1965 Challenge Cup Final during the 1964–65 season at Wembley Stadium, London on Saturday 8 May 1965, in front of a crowd of 89,016.

County Cup Final appearances
Danny Gardiner played left-, i.e. number 8, in Wigan's 16-13 victory over Oldham in the 1966 Lancashire County Cup Final during the 1966–67 season at Station Road, Swinton, on Saturday 29 October 1966.

Genealogical information
Danny Gardiner was the older brother of the rugby league footballer who played in the 1960s for Workington Town (A-Team plus 4-matches during the 1964–65 season); John Eric Gardiner (birth registered second ¼  in Ulverston district, Lancashire, England).

References

External links
!Great Britain Statistics at englandrl.co.uk (statistics currently missing due to not having appeared for both Great Britain, and England)
Statistics at wigan.rlfans.com

1939 births
2015 deaths
English rugby league players
Great Britain national rugby league team players
Lancashire rugby league team players
Oldham R.L.F.C. players
People from Furness
Rugby league players from Cumbria
Rugby league players from Ulverston
Rugby league props
Rugby league second-rows
Wigan Warriors players
Workington Town players